James Cerretani and Leander Paes were the defending champions but only Cerretani chose to defend his title, partnering Marcelo Arévalo. Cerretani lost in the quarterfinals to Miomir Kecmanović and Darian King.

Robert Galloway and Nathaniel Lammons won the title after defeating Romain Arneodo and Andrei Vasilevski 7–5, 7–6(7–1) in the final.

Seeds

Draw

References
 Main draw

Oracle Challenger Series - Newport Beach - Men's Doubles
2019 Men's Doubles